Sandré Swanson (born November 28, 1948) is an American politician who served as a member of the California State Assembly for the 16th district from 2006 to 2012.

Early life and education 
Swanson was born in Oakland, California. He earned an associate's degree in psychology from Oakland City College and a Bachelor of Arts degree in psychology from San Francisco State University.

Career 
Swanson began his political career in 1971 as a member of the Oakland Anti-Poverty Board. He later worked as the advance team manager for Shirley Chisholm's 1972 presidential campaign. From 1973 to 1998, he served as a district director and a senior policy advisor to then Congressman-Ron Dellums.

Swanson later served as chief of staff to Congresswoman Barbara Lee. He endorsed Hillary Clinton in the 2008 presidential election.

References

1948 births
Living people
Politicians from Oakland, California
African-American state legislators in California
Democratic Party members of the California State Assembly
San Francisco State University alumni
21st-century American politicians
21st-century African-American politicians
20th-century African-American people